In mathematical analysis, the Haar measure assigns an "invariant volume" to subsets of locally compact topological groups, consequently defining an integral for functions on those groups.

This measure was introduced by Alfréd Haar in 1933, though its special case for Lie groups had been introduced by Adolf Hurwitz in 1897 under the name "invariant integral". Haar measures are used in many parts of analysis, number theory, group theory, representation theory, statistics, probability theory, and ergodic theory.

Preliminaries
Let  be a locally compact Hausdorff topological group. An element of the Borel algebra is called a Borel set.
 Left translate: 
 Right translate: 

Left and right translates map Borel sets onto Borel sets.

Haar's theorem
There is, up to a positive multiplicative constant, a unique countably additive, nontrivial measure  on the Borel subsets of  satisfying the following properties:

 The measure  is left-translation-invariant:  for every  and all Borel sets .
 The measure  is finite on every compact set:  for all compact .
 The measure  is  outer regular on Borel sets : 
 The measure  is inner regular on open sets : 

It can be shown as a consequence of the above properties that  for every non-empty open subset .

The two measures need not coincide.

Some authors define a Haar measure on Baire sets rather than Borel sets. This makes the regularity conditions unnecessary as Baire measures are automatically regular. Halmos rather confusingly uses the term "Borel set" for elements of the -ring generated by compact sets, and defines Haar measures on these sets.

The left Haar measure satisfies the inner regularity condition for all -finite Borel sets, but may not be inner regular for all Borel sets. For example, the product of the unit circle (with its usual topology) and the real line with the discrete topology is a locally compact group with the product topology and a Haar measure on this group is not inner regular for the closed subset . But, using outer regularity, one can show the segment has infinite measure.)

The existence and uniqueness (up to scaling) of a left Haar measure was first proven in full generality by André Weil.

Example 

Haar integral
This integral is called the Haar integral and is denoted as:

where  is the Haar measure.

This is immediate for indicator functions:

which is essentially the definition of left invariance.

Uses

In the same issue of Annals of Mathematics and immediately after Haar's paper, the Haar theorem was used to solve Hilbert's fifth problem restricted to compact groups by John von Neumann.

Abstract harmonic analysis
The Haar measures are used in harmonic analysis on locally compact groups, particularly in the theory of Pontryagin duality.

Mathematical statistics
In mathematical statistics, Haar measures are used for prior measures, which are prior probabilities for compact groups of transformations. These prior measures are used to construct admissible procedures, by appeal to the characterization of admissible procedures as Bayesian procedures (or limits of Bayesian procedures) by Wald. For example, a right Haar measure for a family of distributions with a location parameter results in the Pitman estimator, which is best equivariant. When left and right Haar measures differ, the right measure is usually preferred as a prior distribution. For the group of affine transformations on the parameter space of the normal distribution, the right Haar measure is the Jeffreys prior measure. Unfortunately, even right Haar measures sometimes result in useless priors, which cannot be recommended for practical use, like other methods of constructing prior measures that avoid subjective information.

Another use of Haar measure in statistics is in conditional inference, in which the sampling distribution of a statistic is conditioned on another statistic of the data. In invariant-theoretic conditional inference, the sampling distribution is conditioned on an invariant of the group of transformations (with respect to which the Haar measure is defined). The result of conditioning sometimes depends on the order in which invariants are used and on the choice of a maximal invariant, so that by itself a  statistical principle of invariance fails to select any unique best conditional statistic (if any exist); at least another principle is needed.

For non-compact groups, statisticians have extended Haar-measure results using amenable groups.

Weil's converse theorem

In 1936, André Weil proved a converse (of sorts) to Haar's theorem, by showing that if a group has a left invariant measure with a certain separating property, then one can define a topology on the group, and the completion of the group is locally compact and the given measure is essentially the same as the Haar measure on this completion.

See also
 Invariant measure
 Pontryagin duality
 Riesz–Markov–Kakutani representation theorem

Notes

Further reading

.

 
 André Weil, Basic Number Theory, Academic Press, 1971.

External links
 The existence and uniqueness of the Haar integral on a locally compact topological group - by Gert K. Pedersen
 On the Existence and Uniqueness of Invariant Measures on Locally Compact Groups - by Simon Rubinstein-Salzedo

Lie groups
Topological groups
Measures (measure theory)
Harmonic analysis